The Church of St. Paul is a parish church in the Church of England, located on Mansfield Road in Daybrook, Nottingham.
The parish includes  St Timothy church centre. 

St Paul's church is a Grade II* listed building by the Department for Digital, Culture, Media and Sport as it is a particularly significant building of more than local interest.

History

St. Paul's Church was designed by the architect John Loughborough Pearson between 1892 and 1896 and its construction began during May 1893 under the direction of J W Woodsend. Excluding the spire and tower – which were added in 1897 – the church was finished in December 1895 and consecrated on 4 February 1896 in honour of Paul the Apostle, who is depicted on the stained glass of the windows. The cost of building the church was £26,000 (equivalent to £ in ) and was paid for by Sir Charles Seely.

Stained glass
The stained glass windows are by Clayton and Bell. They illustrate the life and works of Saint Paul.

Bells

There are eight bells in the tower cast by Mears and Stainbank in London in 1897.

Organ
The organ was built by Augustus Gern in 1896.  It is a two-manual instrument of twenty-four stops situated in the north chancel aisle and its oaken case is delicately carved and traceried.

List of organists

Miss Potter

See also
List of new ecclesiastical buildings by J. L. Pearson
Photos of the bells and features of the church, November 2018

References

Sources
The Buildings of England, Nottinghamshire, 1951, Nikolaus Pevsner
Department of Culture, Media and Sport. Building listing information.

External links
St. Paul’s Church on Google Street View

Churches in Nottingham
Grade II* listed churches in Nottinghamshire
Church of England church buildings in Nottinghamshire
Religious organizations established in 1896
19th-century Church of England church buildings
J. L. Pearson buildings